Joseph Meifred (1791–1867) was a hornist, a pedagogue, and a horn designer. He studied at the Conservatoire de Paris with Louis-François Dauprat and won the first prize in horn performance in 1818. He later became a professor at the conservatory and taught until his retirement in 1864.

He obtained his technical background by graduating from the Arts et Métiers ParisTech engineering school.

One of his most enduring works is the Method for the chromatic horn, or horn with pistons (1840).

References
 Ericson, John. "Joseph Meifred and the early valved horn in france." 1992. (Dissertation excerpt)
 Snedeker, Jeffrey. "The Early Valved Horn and Its Proponents in Paris 1826-1840," The Horn Call Annual 6 (1994): pp. 6–17.
 Snedeker, Jeffrey. "Joseph Meifred's Méthode pour le Cor Chromatique ou à Pistons (1840)," Historic Brass Society Journal 4 (1992): pp. 87–105. 
 Snedeker, Jeffrey. “Hand and Valve: Joseph Émile Meifred’s Méthode pour le cor chromatique ou à pistons and early valved horn performance and pedagogy in nineteenth century France.” Jagd- und Waldhörner: Geschichte und musikalische Nutzung. Augsburg, Germany: Michaelstein, 2006.
 Snedeker, Jeffrey. "Fétis and the 'Meifred' Horn," Journal of the American Musical Instrument Society (Fall 1997).

External links

1791 births
1867 deaths
Conservatoire de Paris alumni
Arts et Métiers ParisTech alumni
Academic staff of the Conservatoire de Paris
French classical horn players
19th-century classical musicians